This is a list of notable events relating to the environment in 1988. They relate to environmental law, conservation, environmentalism and environmental issues.

Events
The Flora and Fauna Guarantee Act 1988 is signed in the Australian state of Victoria. It is designed to protect species, genetic material and habitats, to prevent extinction and allow maximum genetic diversity within the state of Victoria for perpetuity and was the first Australian legislation to deal with such issues.

June
 Rats were eradicated from Breaksea Island, New Zealand after a successful trial on the smaller Hāwea Island.

September
The Vienna Convention for the Protection of the Ozone Layer enters into force.
The China–Australia Migratory Bird Agreement between Australia and China come into force. It is to minimise harm to the major areas used by birds which migrate between the two countries.

November
US president Ronald Reagan signed the Medical Waste Tracking Act.

December
Chico Mendes, a Brazilian conservationist and advocate for human rights, is killed by a rancher.

See also

Human impact on the environment
List of environmental issues